Kanton may refer to:
The German name used for the Cantons of Switzerland or the Cantons of Prussia
The Bosnian name used for the Cantons of the Federation of Bosnia and Herzegovina
A variation of Canton, the old English name for Guangzhou in China
Kanton Island in Kiribati, Pacific Ocean
Historical divisions of the Republic of Tatarstan, Russia

See also
Canton (disambiguation)